Rudy Reyes Erice (born November 5, 1979 in Arroyo Naranjo, Havana, Cuba) is an infielder for Industriales of the Cuban National Series and the Cuban national baseball team. He was part of the Cuban team at the 2006 World Baseball Classic.

Reyes, who hit .308 for Industriales during 2005-06, split his time between second base (38 games), third base (25 games) and shortstop (21 games).

He is the son of former boxer Pedro Orlando Reyes.

References

1979 births
Living people
Baseball players at the 2011 Pan American Games
Cuban baseball players
2006 World Baseball Classic players
2015 WBSC Premier12 players
Pan American Games bronze medalists for Cuba
Pan American Games medalists in baseball
Baseball players at the 2015 Pan American Games
Central American and Caribbean Games gold medalists for Cuba
Competitors at the 2006 Central American and Caribbean Games
Central American and Caribbean Games medalists in baseball
Medalists at the 2015 Pan American Games